Vitaly Halberstadt (20 March 1903, Odessa – 25 October 1967, Paris) was a French chess player, theorist, tactician, problemist, and, above all, a noted endgame study composer.

Born in Odessa, in the Kherson Governorate of the Russian Empire (present-day Ukraine), he emigrated to France after the Russian Civil War.

Chess games

Publications 
In 1932, Halberstadt published with Marcel Duchamp "L'Opposition et les cases conjugées sont réconciliées", a chess manual dedicated to several special end-game problems, for which Duchamp designed the layout and cover. In this book, Duchamp and Halberstadt addressed the complication of the so-called "heterodox opposition",  which is a precisely organized endgame that involved two kings and a handful of pawns. This concept has established a figure of immobilized reversibility between two subjective positions and two players. Within a condition where only two kings remain, the duo described the move in the following manner:The king 'may act in such a way as to suggest he has completely lost interest in winning the game. Then the other king, if he is a true sovereign, can give the appearance of being even less interested.' Until one of them provokes the other into a blunder. Halberstadt was also the author of "Curiosités tactiques des finales" (1954).

References

External links

1903 births
1967 deaths
People from Kherson Governorate
Odesa Jews
Soviet emigrants to France
French people of Ukrainian-Jewish descent
Ukrainian chess players
French chess players
Jewish chess players
Chess composers
20th-century chess players